Strumska Slava is a Bulgarian association football club based in Radomir, Pernik Province. The club currently plays in the Second Professional League, the second tier of Bulgarian football.

It was founded in 1927. The club colors are red and blue.

History 
Strumska Slava was founded in 1927. The club saw little success throughout the majority of its history, usually competing at or below the third level of Bulgarian football. 

In 2017, Strumska Slava won the Southwest Third League and gained promotion to the Second League for the first time in history.

Honours 
Second League
  Winners (1): 1953–54

Third League
  Winners (1): 2016–17

Bulgarian Cup
 Quarter-finals (1): 2018–19

Current squad 
As of 22 September 2022

For recent transfers, see Transfers summer 2022.

Foreign players
Only one non-EU nationals can be registered and given a squad number for the first team in the Second League. Those non-EU nationals with European ancestry can claim citizenship from the nation their ancestors came from. If a player does not have European ancestry he can claim Bulgarian citizenship after playing in Bulgaria for 5 years.

EU Nationals

EU Nationals (Dual citizenship)

Non-EU Nationals

Past seasons

References

External links
bgclubs.eu

 
Football clubs in Bulgaria
Association football clubs established in 1927
1927 establishments in Bulgaria